Michael LaRosa is an American journalist and political advisor who was the press secretary for the First Lady in the Biden administration from 2021 to 2022. LaRosa previously worked as a spokesman for Jill Biden and the Joe Biden 2020 presidential campaign.

Education 
LaRosa attended Easton Area School District schools in Northampton County, Pennsylvania, graduating from Easton Area High School in 2002. He earned a Bachelor of Arts degree in political science and communications from Seton Hall University and a Master of Arts in political science and government from American University. During high school and college, LaRosa was a competitive swimmer.

Career 
LaRosa began his career in politics as an intern for Hillary Clinton's re-election campaign for the United States Senate. He later worked as a personal assistant to Representative Melissa Bean and a scheduler for Kirsten Gillibrand. He also worked as special assistant to the deputy director of the United States Office of Personnel Management.

LaRosa worked as a segment producer and writer for Hardball with Chris Matthews. From 2017 to 2019, he was the communications director for Senator Maria Cantwell. He was also the communications director for the United States Senate Committee on Energy and Natural Resources. From April to November 2019, he was the deputy director of the House Democratic Policy and Communications Committee. He joined the Joe Biden 2020 presidential campaign in November 2019, working as chief spokesman and traveling press secretary for Jill Biden. In January 2021, LaRosa was selected to serve as Press Secretary for the First Lady in the incoming Biden administration. On July 31, 2022, LaRosa resigned as press secretary for First Lady Dr. Jill Biden.

References 

Living people
Seton Hall University alumni
American University alumni
Biden administration personnel
Employees of the United States Senate
First Lady of the United States press secretaries
Joe Biden 2020 presidential campaign
MSNBC people
People from Northampton County, Pennsylvania
United States Office of Management and Budget officials
Year of birth missing (living people)